Ashok Bhan (born 2 October 1943) is an Indian Judge and former Justice of the Supreme Court of India.

Career
Bhan started practice in the Punjab and Haryana High Court in 1965. He also served as part-time Lecturer in Law faculty of Panjab University. He became the Additional Advocate General of Punjab in 1979. Bhan was designated as Senior Advocate in December 1982 and worked as Senior Standing Counsel for the Chandigarh Administration as well as Department of Income Tax, Government of India in his lawyer career. On 15 June 1990 Bhan was appointed as an additional Judge of the Punjab and Haryana High Court. He was transferred to the Karnataka High Court on in 1997. He served there as Acting Chief Justice from 26 June 2000 to 20 October 2000. Justice Bhan was elevated as the Judge of the Supreme Court of India on 17 June 2001. On 8 February 2007, he was nominated in the post of Executive Chairman of National Legal Service Authority of India. Justice Bhan was retired from the post on 2 October 2008. After the retirement he became the President of National Consumer Disputes Redressal Commission (NCDRC) in New Delhi. His son Akshay Bhan, a National Law School alumni, is one of the Government panel advocate in the Supreme Court.

References

1943 births
Living people
20th-century Indian judges
21st-century Indian judges
Indian judges
Justices of the Supreme Court of India
Chief Justices of the Karnataka High Court
Judges of the Karnataka High Court
Judges of the Punjab and Haryana High Court